The World Military Sailing Championship are the World Military Championships in sailing, organized by the International Military Sports Council (CISM) since 1949.

History 
The first World Military Sailing Championships was held in Brest, France in 1949, in the Star class. In 1954 the International Military Sports Council (CSIM) combined two sports disciplines, naval pentathlon and sailing, forming what they called "Sea Week". From 1954 through to 2000 Sea Week took place almost every year. In 1998 the CISM Board of Directors reverted their decision to host the two previous sporting disciplines and the last Sea Week Championship was hosted by Sweden in 2000.

In the year of the Military World Games (from 1995, every four years), championship are the same of the World Games tournament, except at the 2nd Military World Games in Croatia (1999), when sailing was not included as a sport because Denmark hosted a World Military Sailing Championship instead.

Editions and champions

References

External links